The Honduras men's national tennis team represents Honduras in Davis Cup tennis competition and are governed by the Federación Hondureña de Tenis.

Honduras currently compete in the Americas Zone of Group III.  Their best finish is fifth in Group III.

History
Honduras competed in its first Davis Cup in 1998.

Current team (2022) 

 Alejandro Obando
 Keny Turcios
 Mario Richmagui (Junior player)
 Edwin Marcia (Captain-player)

See also
Davis Cup
Honduras Fed Cup team

External links

Davis Cup teams
Davis Cup
Davis Cup